The 1994 Brentwood Borough Council election took place on 5 May 1994 to elect members of Brentwood Borough Council in England.

Results summary

Ward results

Brentwood North

Brentwood South

Brentwood West

Brizes & Doddinghurst

Hutton East

Hutton North

Hutton South

Ingatestone & Fryerning

Pilgrims Hatch

Shenfield

South Weald

Warley

West Horndon

References

1994
1994 English local elections